J. D. Hill (born October 30, 1948, in Stockton, California) is an American former professional player who was a wide receiver for seven seasons in the National Football League (NFL) for the Buffalo Bills and Detroit Lions. He played college football at Arizona State University. He was the first wide receiver selected in the 1971 NFL Draft at 4th in the first round by the Bills. His son, Lonzell Hill, also played wide receiver in the NFL. Another son, Shelby Hill, was a wide receiver for Syracuse University.

In 2014 Hill and seven other players were named as plaintiffs in a lawsuit against the NFL. It alleges he, and more than 400 others were illegally given narcotics to mask the pain so they could play in games.  "I became addicted and turned to the streets after my career and was homeless. Never took a drug in my life, and I became a junkie in the NFL" he said.

References

1948 births
Living people
Players of American football from Stockton, California
American football wide receivers
Arizona State Sun Devils football players
Buffalo Bills players
Detroit Lions players
American Conference Pro Bowl players
All-American college football players